= Constituency RSM-161 =

Reserved constituency of the Provincial Assembly of Sindh, Pakistan

RSM-161
- Provincial Reserved constituency for the Provincial Assembly of Sindh

Current constituency

RSM-161 is a reserved Constituency of the Provincial Assembly of Sindh.

== See also ==
- Sindh
